The University of Burdwan (also known as Burdwan University or B. U.) is an Indian premier autonomous state research university in Purba Bardhaman, West Bengal, India. It was established by the West Bengal Government as a teaching and affiliating university on 15 June 1960 with six graduate departments and 30 undergraduate colleges spread over three districts that come under the jurisdiction of the university. The university currently offers more than 30 undergraduate and 66 postgraduate courses.

The university has been accredited with 'Grade A' by NAAC in the year 2016.The European Space Agency wishes to thank The University of Burdwan for the successful Galileo position fix made on 3 July 2013 in Burdwan.

History
The last maharaja of Burdwan, Udaychand Mahtab, left the entire property of Burdwan to the government of West Bengal after the zamindari system ended in the 1950s. The then chief minister of West Bengal, Bidhan Chandra Roy took the initiative of establishing a university at the premises of the palace of the maharaja. Thus the university was established in 1960. Sukumar Sen (ICS) was the first vice-chancellor. The university began with the humanities division, with the science and engineering courses included afterwards.

The university had jurisdiction over Purulia district, Birbhum district, Paschim Bardhaman district, Bankura district, Purba Bardhaman district and Hooghly district except the Srirampore subdivision. Over the years, the university lost the jurisdiction over the districts of Purulia, Bankura, Birbhum and Asansol, Durgapur to local universities, namely Sidho Kanho Birsha University in Purulia, Bankura University in Bankura, Biswa Bangla Biswabidyalay in Birbhum, Kazi Nazrul University in Asansol & Durgapur and Rani Rashmoni Green University in Hoogly.

Campus and location
The university has four academic campuses — Golapbag Campus, Engineering & Technology Campus (University Institute of Technology), Rajbati Campus & The Tara Bag Campus for Medical Education.

Organisation and administration

Governance
Burdwan University is an autonomous state university. The governor of the state of West Bengal is its chancellor. Daily administration is handled under the leadership of the vice chancellor, who is appointed by the governor on the recommendations of the government of West Bengal. The vice chancellor is assisted by the pro vice chancellor who is de facto a senior faculty member of faculty of engineering and technology.

In the administrative structure, the highest body is the university court. It consists of members elected by the staff of the university from amongst themselves as well as alumni.

Next in hierarchy comes the executive council, which takes all the decisions relating to day-to-day functioning. It consists of staff and student members from the three faculties. The student members of the faculties finding representation on the executive council are the chairmen of the three student councils of unions.

The three faculties, in turn, have their own councils that are changed every four years and differ in their compositions. The Engineering faculty, for example, has members who are nominated either by the vice chancellor or are invited from the schools under the faculty. The Arts and Science faculties have member from the respective faculties. A common factor in each of the three is that each department is represented on the council by the head of the department and at least one other faculty member of the department.

Outside these councils are the offices of the registrar, finance officer, controller of examinations, university engineer, faculty secretaries, placement coordinator, and deans of the three faculties and students welfare which are responsible for the administrative tasks delegated to them. Finally, at the departmental level are the heads of departments.

Faculties and departments
The University of Burdwan has 30 departments organized into two faculty councils.

 Faculty of Science

This faculty consists of the departments of Mathematics, Physics, Chemistry, Computer Science, Biotechnology, Psychology, Statistics, Geology, Environmental Science, Anthropology, Geography, Electronics, Biochemistry, Nutrition, Microbiology, Physiology, Environmental Science, Botany, and Zoology.

 Faculty of Arts and Commerce

This faculty council consists of the departments of Bengali, English, Hindi, Sanskrit, Arabic, Foreign Language, Santali, History, Political Science, Economics, Philosophy, Education, Sociology, Library and Information Science, Mass Communication, Physical Education, Women's Studies, Tourism Management, Tourism, Law, Commerce, and Business Administration.

Others
 Professional Course

This faculty council consists of the departments of Communicative English, Guidance and Counselling, Yoga Therapy.

 B.ed,M.ed, Special B.Ed.

University Institute of Technology (UIT)

University Institute of Technology (UIT) is a Government autonomous old professional Engineering Campus.Now Department/Faculty of Engineering & Technology Campus in The University of Burdwan.  It represents the faculty of Engineering that was at National Institute of Technology, Durgapur since its inception. This college was inaugurated in 2001 by the then chief minister of West Bengal Shri Buddhadeb Bhattacharya.

UIT is approved by the Government of West Bengal and All India Council for Technical Education (AICTE). UIT is a National Board of Accreditation (NBA) accredited institute. Admission in this college is done through centralized counseling by West Bengal Joint Entrance Examination Board. It is a NAAC accredited  'A' grade institute of the University of Burdwan.

Affiliations
The University of Burdwan is an affiliating institution and has jurisdiction over the colleges of the Birbhum district, Purba Bardhaman district and Hooghly district except Srirampore subdivision. There are currently 189 affiliated colleges (including degree colleges, BEd colleges and private professional institutes) under the University of Burdwan.

Academics

Admission

For admissions to the Engineering faculty at the undergraduate level, students are admitted through the WBJEE, an entrance examination open to students from all over India. Unlike in a large number of states, there is no domicile quota in BU (or for other engineering colleges admitting students through the WBJEE). Postgraduate students in engineering are admitted through GATE.

Admission to the Arts and Science faculties is by individual examinations for each of the departments at the undergraduate and postgraduate levels. Weight is given to marks obtained at the higher secondary level for undergraduate admissions and at the undergraduate level for postgraduate level.

Distance education
The University of Burdwan has a Directorate of Distance Education (DDE, BU) for conducting post-graduate studies in distance mode. This is for people (mainly workers) who cannot undergo post-graduate studies in regular (full-time) mode. The DDE was established in 1994. Courses of distance education in the university are approved by University Grants Commission (UGC) and the Distance Education Council.

Library and centers
The university has a "Central Library" including other Departmental Libraries.

Meghnad Saha Planetarium
The Meghnad Saha Planetarium, established in 1944, is the only planetarium in India operating under any university. This planetarium is the pride of the university. This planetarium organizes different shows on the mysteries of the universe, birth of stars, the motion of planets, aspects of lunar exploration, and other astrophysical phenomena using modern technologies.

University museum and art gallery
Burdwan University Museum and Art Gallery have collections of different antiquities and art objects dating from 1500 BC to the 19th century AD. Museum also has collections of stone sculptures bronze figures, ancient coins, brass and alloy, painting of the Indo-European school, terracotta plaques, etc. One can visit the university museum any day (except holidays) during office hours (11 AM to 4 PM).

Accreditation and rankings 

Burdwan University ranked 85th among universities by National Institutional Ranking Framework (NIRF) in 2021.

Notable alumni 

Sukumar Sen, Indian civil servant who was the first Chief Election Commissioner of India and Sudan. 
Amalendu Chandra, Chemist, Shanti Swarup Bhatnagar laureate
Akhil Ranjan Chakravarty, Chemist, Shanti Swarup Bhatnagar laureate
Partha Sarathi Mukherjee, Indian inorganic chemist, Shanti Swarup Bhatnagar laureate
Suman Kumar Dhar Indian molecular biologist, Shanti Swarup Bhatnagar laureate
Asish Banerjee, Deputy speaker of the West Bengal Legislative Assembly
Nepal Mahata, Deputy Leader of Opposition in West Bengal State Legislative Assembly
Tapas Kumar Maji, Shanti Swarup Bhatnagar laureate
Tapas Paul, Indian actor
Abul Hashim, Freedom Fighters
Debasree Chaudhuri, The Minister of State for Woman and Child Development 
Chitra Mandal, Chemical biologist
Rabiranjan Chattopadhyay, Minister for the departments of Technical Education and Training, Science and Technology and Biotechnology in the Government of West Bengal
Riksundar Banerjee, Fiction writer
Pradip Bhattacharya, Member of the Rajya Sabha from the state of West Bengal
Sulekha Sanyal, Bengali writer and activist
Saleh Ali Al-Kharabsheh, Jordanian Minister of Energy and Mineral Resources
Minakshi Mukherjee, Indian Politician
Gouri Sankar Bandyopadhyay, Indian Historian

See also 

 List of universities in India
 List of educational institutions in West Bengal

References

External links 

 

 
Educational institutions established in 1960
Universities and colleges in Purba Bardhaman district
1960 establishments in West Bengal
Universities established in the 1960s